"Star Generation" is a song recorded by James Brown. It was released as a single in 1979 and charted #63 R&B. It also appeared on the album The Original Disco Man.

References

James Brown songs
1979 singles
Songs written by Brad Shapiro
Songs written by Randy McCormick
1979 songs
Polydor Records singles